Guo Dan may refer to:
 Guo Dan (archer)
 Guo Dan (speed skater)